Pusté Čemerné  is a village and municipality in Michalovce District in the Kosice Region of eastern Slovakia.

History
In historical records the village was first mentioned in 1254.

Geography
The village lies at an altitude of 135 metres and covers an area of 6.679 km². The municipality has a population of about 375 people.

Culture
The village has a public library and a football pitch.

External links
http://www.statistics.sk/mosmis/eng/run.html

Villages and municipalities in Michalovce District